Indwelling was a Christian technical death metal band from Arizona. The band formed soon after the demise of the Christian hardcore band, Overcome, which all members are affiliated with. The band disbanded probably around 2004, but in 2010 Overcome reunited and are still active.

Members
Last known line-up
 Thomas Washington - vocals, (2000-2003) bass (2000-2004)
 Jason Stinson - guitar (2000-2004)
 Ethan Pajak - drums (2000-2004)
 Jarrod Norris - vocals (2003-2004)

Former
 BJ Ovsak - guitar (2000-2002)

Timeline

Discography
Demo
 Demo 2001 (2001)

Studio albums
 And My Eye Shall Weep (2003, Facedown Records)

References

American Christian metal musical groups
Musical groups established in 2000
Facedown Records artists
Musical groups disestablished in 2004
Heavy metal musical groups from Arizona
American death metal musical groups